The 14th Rifle Division was an infantry division of the Red Army, formed twice. Formed in Moscow in 1922, the division spent most of the interwar period at Vladimir. After moving to the Kola Peninsula during the Winter War, the division fought on that front during the Continuation War. After the end of the Continuation War it became the 101st Guards Rifle Division. The division reformed in 1955 from the 180th Rifle Division but became the 88th Motor Rifle Division in 1957.

History

First formation 
It was formed in Moscow on 1 July 1922. The division headquarters and the 40th Rifle Regiment were stationed at Vladimir. The 41st Rifle Regiment was in Murom and the 42nd Rifle Regiment at Kovrov. The division transferred to the Leningrad Military District in Vologda during the late 1930s. Its regiments were deployed in Vologda, Arkhangelsk and Cherepovets. In September 1939, the regiments were each expanded to division strength, resulting in the formation of the 88th Rifle Division and 168th Rifle Division. On 11 September 1939, its headquarters moved to Murmansk. 

During the Winter War, it covered the Soviet border on the northern and northeastern coast of the Kola Peninsula as part of the Murmansk Group. 

It saw World War II operational service (Russian: part of the 'operational army') from 22 June 1941 to 14 Nov 1944. On 22 Jun 1941, the division was stationed on the part of the front length of 300 kilometers along the coast of the Kola Peninsula from Cape Saint Nose to the island Kildin. It appears to have been part of the 14th Army. On the night of 22 Jun 1941, the two regiments of the division and a reconnaissance battalion were deployed to the border with Finland, and occupied the area from the Barents Sea to Ukhta. On 25 June 1941 the division was reinforced by two regiments of the 52nd Rifle Division. On 29 Jun 1941, parts of Mountain Corps Norway after an artillery preparation and with bomber support launched an attack on the division (part of Operation Silver Fox). The main forces struck at the 95th Rifle Regiment, which was unable to hold strike, and more - in retreat, if not escape to the village Tytivka, dragging approached the position of 325th Rifle Regiment of the same division. The enemy was stopped by the divisional together with parts of the 23rd Fortified Region and supported by the Northern Fleet and the approaching 52nd Rifle Division at the Turn of River West Face (see "Valley of Glory").

On 14 Jul 1941, the 325th Rifle Regiment landed from Northern Fleet ships in the amphibious landing on the north - west coast of the Great Western People Bay, where it fought heroically until 2 August 1941. On this day, the regiment was evacuated from the beachhead and moved by  ship to the main forces of division in the southern part of the Great Western People Bay. 

The 135th Rifle Regiment, separated from the main force of the division, was converted to the 254th Separate Marine Rifle Brigade. The German troops were unable to penetrate the border in their positions. 

On 8 Sep 1941, the division was forced to retreat further, releasing a small bridgehead on the eastern bank of the River.

By October 1941 the front line was stabilized at the bend of the Zapadnaya Litsa River. On 22 Oct 1941 Wehrmacht on the orders passed on the defensive. Enemy at the division site has moved only about 30-60 kilometers, which was a record minimum advancement and satellites of Germany for all time the Second World War. Until October 1944 the front line remained unchanged. The division fought in small-scale battles. During late April and May 1942, the division participated in the unsuccessful Murmansk Offensive with other units. 

On 7 Oct 1944 the division took part in the Petsamo-Kirkenes Operation, advanced on the main line of attack, taking part in the liberation of the cities Pechenga Tarnet, Kirkenes. It was awarded the honorific "Pechenga".  After the operation the division was put in reserve. On 1 November 1944 it was part of 131st Rifle Corps (with 45th and 368th Rifle Divisions) as part of 14th Army, Karelian Front.

On 30 December 1944 it was transformed into the 101st Guards Rifle Division.

Second formation 
In 1955, the 180th Rifle Division was renamed the 14th Rifle Division in Belgorod-Dnestrovskiy, part of the 10th Guards Rifle Corps.

On 17 May 1957, the 88th Motor Rifle Division was formed in Belgorod-Dnestrovskiy, Odessa Oblast, from the 14th Rifle Division. It became the 180th Motor Rifle Division in 1965.

Composition 
The division's first formation included the following units.
 95th Rifle Regiment
 325th Rifle Regiment (excluding one battalion moved to the Northern Fleet on 25 August 1942 and renamed the 357th Separate Marine Battalion 3 September 1942)
 135th Rifle Regiment (until 31 July 1942; converted to the 254th Separate Marine Rifle Brigade)
 155th Rifle Regiment (from 30 July 1942)
 143rd Light Artillery Regiment
 241st Howitzer Artillery Regiment
 149th Separate Anti-Tank Battalion (from 10 June 1943)
 364th Separate Mortar Battalion (from 7 November 1941 to 15 November 1942)
 35th Reconnaissance Company
 14th Engineer Battalion
 112th Separate Communications Battalion (later 766th Separate Communications Company)
 75th Medical Battalion
 139th Motor Company (later 425th Motor Transport Company, 82nd Motor Transport Battalion)
 285th (later 46th) Field Bakery
 203rd (later 81st) Divisional Veterinary Hospital
 669th Field Post Office
 185th Field Cash Office of the State Bank

References

Sources
 

014
1922 establishments in Russia
Infantry divisions of the Soviet Union
Military units and formations of the Soviet Union in the Winter War
Continuation War
Military units and formations established in 1922
Military units and formations disestablished in 1957